Of the 65 federal electoral divisions first contested at the 1901 election, 33 are still in existence without ever being abolished. These are referred to as Federation Divisions, with the Australian Electoral Commission's redistribution guidelines stating that "Every effort should be made to retain the names of original federation divisions".
 The Division of Riverina was abolished in 1984 and re-created in 1993, so has not been contested at every election.
 Although there were 75 members in the House of Representatives in 1901, there were only 65 divisions contested as the states of South Australia and Tasmania consisted of single multi-member divisions electing 7 and 5 members respectively.

In the state parliaments:

 In New South Wales, there is only one of the original 34 contested in 1856 that still exists.
 In Victoria, three of the original 37 contested in 1856 still exist.
 In Queensland there is only one of the original 16 contested in 1860.
 In South Australia there is also only one of the original 17 contested in 1856.
 In Western Australia, five of the original 30 contested in 1890 still exist.
 In the Northern Territory, there are nine of the original 19 contested in 1974.
 In both Tasmania and the Australian Capital Territory none still exist.

Federal

State

New South Wales
 Electoral district of Parramatta

Victoria
 Electoral district of Brighton
 Electoral district of Richmond (Victoria)
 Electoral district of Williamstown

Queensland
 Electoral district of South Brisbane

South Australia
 Electoral district of Flinders

Western Australia
 Electoral district of Albany
 Electoral district of Bunbury
 Electoral district of Fremantle
 Electoral district of Geraldton
 Electoral district of Murray-Wellington

Northern Territory
 Electoral division of Arnhem
 Electoral division of Barkly
 Electoral division of Casuarina
 Electoral division of Fannie Bay
 Electoral division of Nhulunbuy
 Electoral division of Nightcliff
 Electoral division of Port Darwin
 Electoral division of Sanderson
 Electoral division of Stuart

References

Electorates contested at every election
 Australia
Electorates contested at every election